Working the Web was a short lived 30 minute American television program on ZDTV (later TechTV) that aired from 2000 to 2001. The show, filmed in San Francisco, California, was hosted by Gary Bolles with David Stevenson and David Spark as correspondents. Each episode showed off the best ways to grow business using the Internet.  

The program was sponsored by UPS in an effort showcase UPS Online Services, a set of APIs for tracking, time-in-transit, and a "quick cost calculator".

External links

Documentary television series about computing
TechTV original programming